Ivo Slavchev (born 21 January 1968) is a former Bulgarian professional footballer who played as a defensive midfielder.

He was a squad member at the 1987 FIFA World Youth Championship.

References

1968 births
Living people
Bulgarian footballers
Bulgaria youth international footballers
Bulgaria under-21 international footballers
Bulgaria international footballers
First Professional Football League (Bulgaria) players
PFC Minyor Pernik players
FC Lokomotiv 1929 Sofia players
PFC CSKA Sofia players
PFC Slavia Sofia players
PFC Marek Dupnitsa players
PFC Akademik Svishtov players
Association football midfielders
People from Pernik